Tina Linnéa Enström (born 23 March 1991) is a Swedish retired ice hockey player from Örnsköldsvik, Sweden. She played forward position for the Sweden women's national ice hockey team.

Playing career
She played with the MODO Örnskoldsvik in the Riksserien (Sweden league elite).

On June 8, 2011, it was announced that Enstrom (and Swedish national teammate Erika Grahm) would join the Bulldogs for the 2011–12 Minnesota–Duluth Bulldogs women's ice hockey season. However, she never attended UMD.

International career
She won the bronze medal at the 2007 Women's World Ice Hockey Championships in Winnipeg, Manitoba, Canada.

Personal life
She is the sister of retired NHL and SHL player Tobias Enström.

References

External links
 
 

1991 births
Ice hockey players at the 2010 Winter Olympics
Living people
Swedish women's ice hockey forwards
Olympic ice hockey players of Sweden
Modo Hockey Dam players
Djurgårdens IF Hockey Dam players
Linköping HC Dam players
Sportspeople from Västernorrland County